Port Stanley Airport  is an airport in the Falkland Islands,  outside the capital, Stanley. The airport is the only civilian airport in the islands with a paved runway.  However, RAF Mount Pleasant, located to the west of Stanley, functions as the islands' main international airport, because it has a long runway and allows civilian flights.  Port Stanley Airport is operated by the Government of the Falkland Islands, and is used for internal flights between the islands and flights between the Falklands and Antarctica.

History 

Prior to 1972, there was no airport in the Falkland Islands with a paved runway, and all trips to the islands had to be undertaken by boat. However, in the early 1970s, the Falkland Islands Company decided to withdraw its monthly supply ship to Montevideo, Uruguay, increasing the desirability of an air link to the South American mainland.

In 1971, the Argentine Air Force broke the islands' isolation starting with amphibious flights from Comodoro Rivadavia with Grumman HU-16B Albatross aircraft operated by LADE, Argentina's military airline.

In 1973, the United Kingdom signed a Communications Agreement with Argentina to fund an airstrip on the islands. Flights took place again from Comodoro Rivadavia, this time with Fokker F-28 twin jet aircraft. This service was maintained until 1982 representing the only connection to the islands. At first, these flights landed at a temporary airstrip at Hookers Point at the east end of Port Stanley where the runway was constructed of Pierced Runway Planking.  This situation continued until 1978, when a storm tore up large areas of the runway, rendering it unusable. By this time however a permanent solution was in hand and on 1 May 1979 a new airport was opened at Cape Pembroke by Sir Vivian Fuchs with a  paved runway. It immediately became home to the Falkland Islands Government Air Service (FIGAS) with its Islanders and Beavers.

The Royal Air Force also used the airport for flights to supply and reinforce the British military garrison when necessary.

Falklands War 
During the Falklands War of 1982, Argentine forces occupied the airport. The Argentine Air Force were unable to place their most advanced fighter jets at the base given the relatively short runway, and the risk of attack by the British. However, several air force FMA IA 58 Pucarás with Argentine Navy Aermacchi MB-339 and T-34 Mentor for close air support and air reconnaissance were based at the airport. The Pucarás were deployed against the British land forces, shooting down a Westland Scout and the Aermacchis against the British Fleet.

On 1 May 1982, the Royal Air Force bombed the airport in Operation Black Buck and several other raids were carried out by embarked Harriers. Through the conflict, the airport installations were attacked with 237 bombs, 1,200 shells by deployed Royal Navy ships and 16 missiles. The 42 1,000-lb bombs dropped by the two Black Buck missions left twin strings of craters which are still visible on satellite photos of the airport today. However, none of these attacks ever put the airfield out of action entirely, and even both Black Buck raids only managed to score one direct hit on the runway, which was repaired sufficiently to allow for C-130 Hercules, Lockheed L-188 Electra and Fokker F-28 transport aircraft to resume night supply flights within 48 hours. These flights continued to bring supplies, weapons, vehicles, and fuel, and airlift out the wounded right until the end of the conflict. The Argentines left the runway covered with piles of earth during the day, in an attempt to mislead the British regarding the condition of the airfield. In fact, the British were well aware that C-130 flights continued to use the airfield and attempted to interdict these flights leading to the loss of a C-130 on 1 June, which was not, however, engaged in any resupply mission.

During the war the Argentines also heavily mined Yorke Bay to the north of the airport and Surf/Rookery Bays to the southeast with minimum metal mines under the presumption the British would attempt an amphibious landing on the east coast of East Falkland to quickly recapture both the airfield and Stanley in one fell swoop. However, these minefields proved unnecessary when the British opted instead to land at San Carlos on the west coast of East Falkland and attack overland towards Stanley. The beaches surrounding Port Stanley Airport remained heavily mined long after the war as demining had been deemed impractical due to the constantly drifting sand dunes and the disruption that would be done to the breeding colonies of the threatened Magellanic penguin, which continued to thrive on the beaches (being too light to set off the mines). However, the UK eventually commenced these operations in 2009 to comply with the Ottawa Treaty. On November 14, 2020 the island was declared free of landmines.

Post conflict 
After the war, the Royal Air Force took over the airport, renaming it RAF Stanley. Immediately after the conflict air defence of the Islands and garrison was carried out by Sea Harrier FRS.1s and Harrier GR.3s at RAF Stanley and from the aircraft carrier, on standing patrol. The unit was known as "Phandet" until late 1983 when the detachment achieved squadron status following the rundown of No. 23 Squadron RAF in the UK and the resultant transfer of its "nameplate" from RAF Wattisham to the RAF Stanley unit. The Harrier detachment was renamed No. 1453 Flight and remained at RAF Stanley to provide standby air defence, in event of excessive crosswinds, until RAF Mount Pleasant was opened in 1985. In addition, long range Hercules transport aircraft of No. 1312 Flight, resident at RAF Stanley, provided tanker support for the Phantom fighters and transport for local (South Georgia) tasks. The airport was also used by the C-130s of the 'Airbridge' from Ascension Island for trooping and many other essentials until Mount Pleasant became operational.

In 1985, RAF Mount Pleasant opened and in April 1986 Port Stanley Airport returned to civilian use. The temporary aluminium planking runway extension was removed, bringing the runway down to its present length. Although flights from Chile by regional airline Aerovias DAP did use the airport in the early 1990s, for the most part external services have used RAF Mount Pleasant since it opened.

Current status 
The Falkland Islands Government Air Service (FIGAS) operates internal flights within the Falkland Islands from the airport with five Britten-Norman BN-2B Islander aircraft. The British Antarctic Survey uses the airport for intercontinental flights to Rothera Research Station in Antarctica.
Stanley Airport is used by internal flights and provides connections to British bases in Antarctica. Currently Bristow Helicopters is operating three Sikorsky S-92 Helicopters out of Stanley, two for transporting oil rig workers to the Zebedee Oil Rig and the other as a rescue helicopter. However, occasionally one of the aircraft is based at RAF Mount Pleasant as there is lack of space at Stanley Airport.

FIGAS destinations 

East Falklands:

West Falklands:

BAS destinations 
 Rothera, British Antarctic Territory

Notes

References 
 Commodore Ruben Oscar Moro.  La Guerra Inaudita, 2000 
 Ward, 'Sharkey' (1992). Sea Harrier over the Falklands. Orion Books. 
 White, Rowland (2006). Vulcan 607. Bantam Press.

External links 

Airports in the Falkland Islands
East Falkland
Buildings and structures in Stanley, Falkland Islands
Airports established in 1979
1979 establishments in the Falkland Islands